The Binder Park Zoo is a  zoo that opened in 1977 near Battle Creek, Michigan, in the United States. Binder Park Zoo is one of the largest zoos in Michigan, and features a large array of animals and plants, including the Wild Africa Exhibit. It includes a train, a tram, a carousel, and Wildlife Discovery Theatre.

The Binder Park Zoo is an accredited member of the Association of Zoos and Aquariums (AZA), and the World Association of Zoos and Aquariums (WAZA).

Exhibits

Main zoo area 
The main zoo area features various animal exhibits. Near the entrance are the Australian animal species like dingos, red kangaroos, red-necked wallabies, common wallaroos and laughing kookaburras. The northeast corner of the zoo has the American black bear exhibit, snow leopards, Canada lynxes and the start of a nature trail which has a bald eagle aviary. Additionally, the zoo has red pandas, black-tailed prairie dogs, owls, and a lemur exhibit housing ring-tailed lemurs, black-and-white ruffed lemurs and collared brown lemurs. The Binda Conservation Center, features Linnaeus's two-toed sloths, amongst various reptile and amphibian species like the reticulated python and poison dart frogs. Lastly, located near the train, are the Mexican gray wolf and southern ground hornbill habitats. Also located in the main zoo area are the gift shop, Z.O. & O. Railroad station, a restaurant, a  habitat boardwalk called Swamp Adventure, and the new Conservation Carousel.

The Conservation Carousel opened in 2007, and includes various popular zoo animals such as a polar bear, a tiger, and a bronco; the latter paying homage to the nearby Western Michigan University.

Wild Africa 
The Wild Africa Exhibit is a permanent exhibit featuring many species native to Africa. To get a closer view, there is a one way,  loop that begins and ends in a small African themed village, selling souvenirs and food and beverages. The trail itself is themed to resemble a trail inside an African national park complete with a ranger station and fake poachers. Along the trail there is an opportunity to feed giraffes at the Twiga Overlook. Park visitors view the reticulated giraffe herd from a raised platform that places them at eye level with the animals. Leaves of romaine lettuce that are available for purchase can be placed in the palm of one's hand where the giraffes will retrieve them with their  tongues. Other animals visible in the giraffe exhibit, at the overlook, are common ostriches, Grant's zebras, addaxes, waterbucks, bonteboks, addra gazelles, marabou storks, and cinereous vultures. Further down the trail are various smaller exhibits for cheetahs, red-capped mangabeys, Aldabra giant tortoises, colobus monkeys, black mangabeys, red river hogs, and an aviary. Recently added was an exhibit for the zoo's resident African wild dog group, and the brand new lions.

The Wild Africa Exhibit is located away from the main zoo exhibits at the west end, accessible by a free zebra-patterned tram, or a  walking path.

Special guests 
In 2003 two koalas from the San Diego Zoo were brought to Binder Park Zoo along with games and activities with an Australian culture twist.

In 2006, Crunch, a 150-year-old,  alligator snapping turtle was on exhibit at the Conservation Discovery Center from Memorial Day to Labor Day.  The turtle is in the care of the Blackwater Turtle Refuge.

During the summer of 2008, there were numerous births at the zoo to animals that are or have been listed as endangered species.  In June 2008, there was the birth of a female snow leopard cub and three trumpeter swan cygnets.  This was followed by the August birth of a female addra gazelle.

Notes

External links

Zoos in Michigan
Buildings and structures in Calhoun County, Michigan
Protected areas of Calhoun County, Michigan
Tourist attractions in Calhoun County, Michigan